Pseudamnicola is a genus of small brackish water snails with an operculum, aquatic gastropod mollusks in the subfamily Pseudamnicolinae  of the family Hydrobiidae.

Pseudamnicola is the type genus of the subfamily Pseudamnicolinae.

Species 
Species in the genus Pseudamnicola include:

 † Pseudamnicola abxazica Badzoshvili, 1979 
 Pseudamnicola algeriensis Glöer, Bouzid & Boeters, 2010
 † Pseudamnicola almerodensis (Ludwig, 1865) 
 † Pseudamnicola ampla Pană, 2005 (nomen nudum)
 Pseudamnicola artanensis Altaba, 2007
 † Pseudamnicola arvernensis (Bouillet, 1835)
 † Pseudamnicola atropidus (Brusina, 1892) 
 † Pseudamnicola babindolensis Neubauer, Kroh, Harzhauser, Georgopoulou & Mandic, 2015 
 † Pseudamnicola babukici Brusina, 1902 
 Pseudamnicola bacescui Grossu, 1986
 Pseudamnicola barratei Letourneux & Bourguignat, 1887
 Pseudamnicola beckmanni Glöer & Zettler, 2007
 Pseudamnicola bilgini Schütt & Şeşen, 1993
 † Pseudamnicola bilineatus (Simionescu & Barbu, 1940) 
 † Pseudamnicola bithynoides Jekelius, 1932 
 Pseudamnicola boucheti Glöer, Bouzid & Boeters, 2010
 Pseudamnicola brachia Westerlund, 1886
 † Pseudamnicola buxinensis W. Yü & X.-Q. Zhang, 1982 
 † Pseudamnicola buzoiensis Pană, 2003 
 Pseudamnicola calamensis Glöer, Bouzid & Boeters, 2010
 Pseudamnicola canariensis Glöer & Reuselaars, 2020
 † Pseudamnicola capellinii (Wenz, 1919) 
 † Pseudamnicola carenosuturata Pană, 2005  (nomen nudum, unavailable according to Art. 16.4.1.: no types fixed)
 Pseudamnicola chabii Glöer, Bouzid & Boeters, 2010
 Pseudamnicola chamasensis Boeters, 2000
 Pseudamnicola chia (E. von Martens, 1889)
 Pseudamnicola codreanui Glöer, Bouzid & Boeters, 2010
 Pseudamnicola cirikorum D. Odabaşı, 2019
 Pseudamnicola confinis (Brancsik, 1897)
 Pseudamnicola conovula (Frauenfeld, 1863)
 Pseudamnicola constantinae (Letourneux, 1870)
 † Pseudamnicola convexus Sandberger, 1875 
 † Pseudamnicola cous Willmann, 1981 
 † Pseudamnicola cuisensis (Cossmann & Pissarro, 1913)
 † Pseudamnicola curtus (Reuss, 1867)
 † Pseudamnicola cyclostomoides (Sinzov, 1880) 
 Pseudamnicola dobrogicus Grossu, 1986
 † Pseudamnicola dodecanesiacus Willmann, 1981 
  † Pseudamnicola dromicus (Fontannes, 1881)
 Pseudamnicola doumeti Letourneux & Bourguignat, 1887
 † Pseudamnicola elachyspira (Fontannes, 1884) 
 Pseudamnicola elbursensis (Starmühlner & Edlauer, 1957)
 † Pseudamnicola elongatus Taner, 1974 
 Pseudamnicola emilianus (Paladilhe, 1869)
 Pseudamnicola exilis (Frauenfeld, 1863)
 Pseudamnicola fineti Glöer, Bouzid & Boeters, 2010
 † Pseudamnicola fuxinensis X.-H. Yu, 1987 
 Pseudamnicola georgievi Glöer & Pešić, 2012
 † Pseudamnicola gerannensis Rey, 1974 
 Pseudamnicola gerhardfalkneri Glöer, Bouzid & Boeters, 2010
 Pseudamnicola ghamizii Glöer, Bouzid & Boeters, 2010
 † Pseudamnicola giustii Kadolsky, 2008 
 Pseudamnicola globulina Letourneux & Bourguignat, 1887
 † Pseudamnicola globuloides (F. Sandberger, 1871) 
 Pseudamnicola goksunensis Glöer, Gürlek & Kara, 2014
 Pseudamnicola granjaensis Glöer & Zettler, 2007 
 Pseudamnicola gullei Glöer, Yıldırım & Kebapçi, 2015 
 † Pseudamnicola haianensis Gu in Gu & Wang, 1989 
 † Pseudamnicola hebraicus (Schütt in Schütt & Ortal, 1993) 
 † Pseudamnicola hungaricus (Frauenfeld, 1862) 
 Pseudamnicola ianthe Radea & Parmakelis, 2016
 Pseudamnicola ilione Radea & Parmakelis, 2016
 † Pseudamnicola inflatus Jekelius, 1944 
 Pseudamnicola intranodosus Schütt & Şeşen, 1993
 † Pseudamnicola jolyi Pallary, 1901 
 † Pseudamnicola jurassicus W. Yü, 1974
 Pseudamnicola kavosensis Glöer & Zettler, 2021
 Pseudamnicola kayseriensis Glöer, Yıldırım & Kebapçi, 2015 
 † Pseudamnicola kerchensis Iljina in Iljina et al., 1976 
 Pseudamnicola kotschyi Frauenfeld, 1863
 Pseudamnicola krumensis Glöer, Grego, Erőss & Fehér, 2015
 † Pseudamnicola laevigatus (Jekelius, 1932)
 Pseudamnicola latasteana Letourneux & Bourguignat, 1887
 † Pseudamnicola leognanensis (Cossmann & Peyrot, 1918) 
 Pseudamnicola leontinus Grossu, 1986
 Pseudamnicola leprevieri (Pallary, 1928)
 Pseudamnicola lesbosensis Glöer & Reuselaars, 2020
 Pseudamnicola letourneuxianus (Bourguignat, 1862)
 † Pseudamnicola liaoxiensis X.-H. Yu, 1987 
 Pseudamnicola limnosensis Glöer, Stefanov & Georgiev, 2018
 Pseudamnicola linae Glöer, Bouzid & Boeters, 2010
 Pseudamnicola lindbergi C.R. Boettger, 1957
 † Pseudamnicola lobostoma Schütt in Schütt & Besenecker, 1973
 Pseudamnicola lucensis (Issel, 1866)
 Pseudamnicola luteolus (Küster, 1852)
 Pseudamnicola macrostoma (Küster, 1852)
 Pseudamnicola magdalenae Falniowski, 2016
 Pseudamnicola malickyi Schütt, 1980
 Pseudamnicola marashi Glöer, Gürlek & Kara, 2014
 † Pseudamnicola margarita (Neumayr in Herbich & Neumayr, 1875) 
 † Pseudamnicola margaritaeformis (Andrusov, 1905) 
 † Pseudamnicola margaritulus (Fuchs, 1870) 
 Pseudamnicola meloussensis Altaba, 2007
 Pseudamnicola meluzzii Boeters, 1976
 Pseudamnicola meralae Glöer, Gürlek & Kara, 2014
 † Pseudamnicola messapicus Esu & Girotti, 2010 
 † Pseudamnicola micromphalus (O. Boettger, 1869) 
 †  Pseudamnicola minimus (Lörenthey, 1893) 
 Pseudamnicola mitataensis Glöer & Porfyris, 2020
 † Pseudamnicola mocsaryi (Brusina, 1902) 
 † Pseudamnicola monotropidus (Brusina, 1892) 
 Pseudamnicola moussonii (Calcara, 1841)
 † Pseudamnicola muelleri (O. Boettger, 1884) 
 Pseudamnicola negropontinus (Clessin, 1878)
 Pseudamnicola numidicus (Clessin, 1878)
 † Pseudamnicola nympha (Eichwald, 1853) 
 † Pseudamnicola nysti (De Boissy, 1848) 
 Pseudamnicola occultus Glöer & Hirschfelder, 2019
 † Pseudamnicola opimus W. Yü, 1977
 † Pseudamnicola orientalis (Bukowski, 1896) (taxon inquirendum)
 Pseudamnicola orsinii (Küster, 1852)
 Pseudamnicola ouarzazatensis Boulaassafer, Ghamizi, Machordom & Delicado, 2020
 Pseudamnicola oudrefica  (Letourneux & Bourguignat, 1887)
 †Pseudamnicola ovatus (Bouillet, 1835) 
 † Pseudamnicola oxispiriformis (Roman, 1912) 
 † Pseudamnicola oxyspira (Cossmann, 1888) 
 † Pseudamnicola pagoda (Neumayr in Herbich & Neumayr, 1875) 
 † Pseudamnicola pagodaeformis (Andrusov, 1890) 
 † Pseudamnicola palmariggii Esu & Girotti, 2010 
 † Pseudamnicola partschi (Frauenfeld in Hörnes, 1856) 
 † Pseudamnicola pasiphae Willmann, 1980 
 Pseudamnicola penchinati (Bourguignat, 1870)
 † Pseudamnicola pequignoti Pallary, 1901 
 Pseudamnicola pieperi Schütt, 1980
 Pseudamnicola pisolinus (Paladilhe, 1876) (taxon inquirendum)
 † Pseudamnicola pistati (Cossmann, 1907)
 Pseudamnicola prasinus Rosen, 1903
 † Pseudamnicola proximoides (Capellini, 1880) 
 † Pseudamnicola proximus (Fuchs, 1870) 
 † Pseudamnicola proximoides (Capellini, 1880) 
 † Pseudamnicola pumilus Brusina, 1884 
 † Pseudamnicola purpurinus (Andrusov, 1890) 
 Pseudamnicola pyrenaicus Boeters & Falkner, 2009
 Pseudamnicola radeae D. Odabaşı, 2019
 Pseudamnicola ragia Letourneux & Bourguignat, 1887
 Pseudamnicola ramosae Boulaassafer, Ghamizi, Machordom & Delicado, 2020
 Pseudamnicola razelmianus Grossu, 1986
 † Pseudamnicola rotundatus (Montpéreux, 1831) 
 Pseudamnicola rouagi Glöer, Bouzid & Boeters, 2010
 † Pseudamnicola rueppelli (Boettger, 1884) 
 † Pseudamnicola rumanianus Pană, 2003 
 † Pseudamnicola rutoti (Cossmann, 1924) 
 Pseudamnicola samosensis Glöer & Reuselaars, 2020
 † Pseudamnicola schottleri (Wenz, 1922) 
 Pseudamnicola sciaccaensis Glöer & Beckmann, 2007
 Pseudamnicola singularis Letourneux & Bourguignat, 1887
 Pseudamnicola skalaensis Glöer & Reuselaars, 2020
 † Pseudamnicola skhiadicus (Bukowski, 1896) 
 Pseudamnicola solitarius Tchernov, 1971
 Pseudamnicola spiratus (Paladilhe, 1869)
 Pseudamnicola stasimoensis Glöer & Reuselaars, 2020
 † Pseudamnicola subglobulus (d'Orbigny, 1852)
 † Pseudamnicola suevicus (Gottschick, 1928) 
 Pseudamnicola sumbasensis Gürlek, 2019
 † Pseudamnicola taoyuanensis Youluo, 1978 
 † Pseudamnicola terebra (Brongniart, 1810) 
 Pseudamnicola thalesi Odabaşı, Akay & Koyuncuoğlu, 2020
 † Pseudamnicola tholosus Jekelius, 1944 
 † Pseudamnicola transilvanicus (Brusina, 1902)
 † Pseudamnicola triangula Pană, 2005 (nomen nudum, unavailable according to Art. 16.4.1.: no types fixed)
 Pseudamnicola troglobia Bole, 1961 (species inquirenda)
 † Pseudamnicola turonensis (Sandberger, 1875) 
 † Pseudamnicola ultramontanus Wenz, 1919 
 † Pseudamnicola vicinus (Staadt in Cossmann & Pissarro, 1913) 
 Pseudamnicola vinarskii Glöer & Georgiev, 2012
 Pseudamnicola virescens (Küster, 1853) 
 † Pseudamnicola welterschultesi Neubauer, Harzhauser, Kroh, Georgopoulou & Mandic, 2014 
 † Pseudamnicola zonatus (Eichwald, 1853) 

Subgenera and species brought into synonymy
 Subgenus Pseudamnicola (Corrosella) Boeters, 1970 represented as Pseudamnicola Paulucci, 1878 (alternate representation)
 Subgenus Pseudamnicola (Pseudamnicola) Paulucci, 1878 represented as Pseudamnicola Paulucci, 1878 (alternate representation)
 Subgenus † Pseudamnicola (Aluta) Jekelius, 1932: synonym of  † Aluta Jekelius, 1932
 Subgenus Pseudamnicola (Andrussowiella) Wenz, 1939: synonym of Tanousia Servain, 1881
 Subgenus † Pseudamnicola (Bania) Brusina, 1896: synonym of † Bania Brusina, 1896
 Subgenus † Pseudamnicola (Corona) Jekelius, 1932: synonym of  † Pseudamnicola (Barassia) Jekelius, 1933 
 Subgenus Pseudamnicola (Sandria) Brusina, 1886: synonym of Tanousia Servain, 1881
 Subgenus † Pseudamnicola (Staja) Brusina, 1897: synonym of † Staja Brusina, 1897
 Pseudamnicola anteisensis Bérenguier, 1882: synonym of Corrosella astierii (Dupuy, 1851)
 Pseudamnicola astierii Dupuy, 1851: synonym of Corrosella astierii (Dupuy, 1851)
  † Pseudamnicola atava (Andrusov, 1890): synonym of † Tanousia atava (Andrusov, 1890)
  † Pseudamnicola atropida (Brusina, 1892): synonym of † Hydrobia atropida Brusina, 1892
 Pseudamnicola brusiniana (Clessin & W. Dybowski in W. Dybowski, 1888): synonym of Abeskunus brusinianus (Clessin & W. Dybowski in W. Dybowski, 1887)
 Pseudamnicola chamasensis Boeters, 2000: synonym of Pseudamnicola moussonii (Calcara, 1841)
 Pseudamnicola confusa (Frauenfeld, 1863): synonym of Mercuria confusa (Frauenfeld, 1863)
 Pseudamnicola cyrniacus (J. Mabille, 1869): synonym of Pseudamnicola moussonii (Calcara, 1841)
 Pseudamnicola depressispira Logvinenko & Starobogatov, 1968: synonym of Abeskunus depressispira (Logvinenko & Starobogatov, 1969)
 Pseudamnicola desertorum (Bourguignat, 1862): synonym of Pseudamnicola letourneuxiana (Bourguignat, 1862)
 Pseudamnicola exigua (Eichwald, 1838): synonym of Abeskunus exiguus (Eichwald, 1838)
 Pseudamnicola falkneri (Boeters, 1970): synonym of Corrosella falkneri Boeters, 1970
 Pseudamnicola gasulli Boeters, 1981: synonym of Diegus gasulli (Boeters, 1981) (original combination)
 Pseudamnicola geldiayana Schütt & Bilgin, 1970: synonym of Erosiconcha geldiayana (Schütt & Bilgin, 1970) (original combination)
 Pseudamnicola hauffei Delicado & Ramos, 2012: synonym of Corrosella herreroi (Bech, 1993)
 † Pseudamnicola helicella (Sandberger, 1859): synonym of † Mercuria helicella (F. Sandberger, 1858)  (new combination)
 Pseudamnicola hinzi Boeters, 1986: synonym of Corrosella hinzi (Boeters, 1986)(original combination)
 † Pseudamnicola hoeckae Harzhauser & Binder, 2004: synonym of † Bania hoeckae (Harzhauser & Binder, 2004) 
 Pseudamnicola hydrobiopsis Boeters, 1999: synonym of Corrosella hydrobiopsis (Boeters, 1999)
 † Pseudamnicola immutata (Hörnes, 1856): synonym of † Bania immutata (Hörnes, 1856)
 Pseudamnicola kermanshahensis Glöer & Pešić, 2009: synonym of Sarkhia kermanshahensis (Glöer & Pešić, 2009)
 Pseudamnicola luisi Boeters, 1984: synonym of Corrosella luisi (Boeters, 1984) (basionym)
 † Pseudamnicola minima (Fuchs, 1877): synonym of † Pseudamnicola welterschultesi Neubauer, Harzhauser, Kroh, Georgopoulou & Mandic, 2014 
 Pseudamnicola navasiana (Fagot, 1907): synonym of Corrosella navasiana (Fagot, 1907)
 Pseudamnicola pallaryi Ghamizi, Vala & Bouka, 1997: synonym of Corrosella pallaryi (Ghamizi, Vala & Bouka, 1997) (basionym)
  † Pseudamnicola pauluccii Brusina, 1907: synonym of † Bania pauluccii (Brusina, 1907) 
  † Pseudamnicola producta Jekelius, 1944: synonym of † Aluta producta (Jekelius, 1944)
 Pseudamnicola pseudoglobulus (d'Orbigny, 1852): synonym of † Bania pseudoglobula (d'Orbigny, 1852)
 Pseudamnicola raddei Boettger, 1889: synonym of Turkmenamnicola raddei (Boettger, 1889)
  † Pseudamnicola romaniana Pană, 2003: synonym of † Pseudamnicola rumaniana Pană, 2003 
 Pseudamnicola saboori Glöer & Pešić, 2009: synonym of Persipyrgula saboori (Glöer & Pešić, 2009) (original combination)
 † Pseudamnicola sarmatica Jekelius, 1944: synonym of † Staja sarmatica (Jekelius, 1944) 
 Pseudamnicola sphaerion (Mousson, 1863): synonym of Abeskunus exiguus (Eichwald, 1838) (junior synonym)
 † Pseudamnicola steinheimensis (Miller, 1900): synonym of † Bania pseudoglobula steinheimensis (Miller, 1900)
 † Pseudamnicola stosiciana (Brusina, 1874): synonym of † Bania stosiciana (Brusina, 1874)
 Pseudamnicola subproducta (Paladilhe, 1869): synonym of Pseudamnicola spiratus (Paladilhe, 1869)
 † Pseudamnicola torbarianus (Brusina, 1874): synonym of † Bania torbariana (Brusina, 1874)
 Pseudamnicola tramuntanae Altaba, 2007: synonym of Pseudamnicola beckmanni Glöer & Zettler, 2007
 † Pseudamnicola urosevici Pavlović, 1922: synonym of † Bania urosevici (Pavlović, 1931) 
 Pseudamnicola zagrosensis Glöer & Pešić, 2009: synonym of Intermaria zagrosensis (Glöer & Pešić, 2009)
 Pseudamnicola (Barassia) purpurina (Andrusov, 1890): synonym of † Pyrgula purpurina Andrusov, 1890

References 

 Jekelius, E. (1933). Zur Nomenklatur der dazischen Molluskenfauna des Beckens von Brasov. Notationes Biologicae. 1 (2), 65.
 Jekelius, E. (1933). Zur Nomenklatur der dazischen Molluskenfauna des Beckens von Brasov. Notationes Biologicae. 1 (2), 65.
 Jekelius, E. (1933). Zur Nomenklatur der dazischen Molluskenfauna des Beckens von Brasov. Notationes Biologicae. 1 (2), 65.
 Radoman P. (1978). Beispiele der mikrogeographischen Speciation im Ohrid-See und die neue Gattung Adrioinsulana. Archiv für Molluskenkunde. 109(1/3): 45-50.
 Schütt H. and Şeşen R. (1993). "Pseudamnicola species and other freshwater gastropods (Mollusca: Gastropoda) from East Anatolia (Turkey), the Ukraine and the Lebanon". Basteria 57: 161-171.

External links
 Paulucci, M. (1878). Matériaux pour servir à l'étude de la faune malacologique terrestre et fluviatile de l'Italie et de ses iles. Paris: Savy. 54 pp
  Delicado D. & Ramos M.A. (2012) Morphological and molecular evidence for cryptic species of springsnails (genus Pseudamnicola (Corrosella) (Mollusca, Caenogastropoda, Hydrobiidae). ZooKeys 190: 55–79

 
Hydrobiidae
Taxonomy articles created by Polbot